Vida is an unincorporated community in Lane County, Oregon, United States. It is located on Oregon Route 126 and the McKenzie River.

Vida was originally named "Gate Creek", but this caused confusion with a community of "Gates Creek" in Washington County, so the name of the postmaster's daughter was selected instead. The Vida post office was established on April 12, 1898. The postmaster was Francis A. Pepiot.

Vida is home to the historic Goodpasture Bridge, a covered bridge that was added to the National Register of Historic Places in 1979. It is the second-longest covered bridge in Oregon.<ref>

References

External links
Photos of the Goodpasture covered bridge near Vida from Salem Public Library

Unincorporated communities in Lane County, Oregon
1898 establishments in Oregon
Unincorporated communities in Oregon
Populated places established in 1898